Ptinus lichenum is a species of beetles in the genus Ptinus of the family Ptinidae.

Habitat
P. lichenum are found in natural habitats in association with dead wood.

Distribution
P. lichenum has a scattered distribution in the United Kingdom where it is designated as 'rare'. The species is recorded in continental Europe in France and Germany.

References

External links
Drawing of Ptinus lichenum alongside other Ptinids
Images of Ptinus lichenum

lichenum
Beetles of Europe
Beetles described in 1802